Fabian Antoine Eestermans (born 1858 in Meerle) was a Belgian clergyman and prelate for the Roman Catholic Archdiocese of Lahore. He was appointed bishop in 1905. He died in 1931.

References 

1858 births
1931 deaths
Belgian Roman Catholic bishops